A forced orgasm is consensual BDSM or kinky sexual play whereby a person consents to be forced to orgasm in a way that is beyond their control. The person being brought to involuntary orgasm would typically be put in physical restraints to deprive them of the ability to control the onset and intensity of orgasm, and to increase the feeling of helplessness, a situation which some people find sexually arousing.

The practice of forced orgasm may also be combined with other orgasm control plays, such as orgasm denial, edging, or ruined orgasms.

With the consenting partner restrained and unable to stop being sexually stimulated, the active partner would stimulate their genitals and other erogenous zones until the bound partner is brought to orgasm, and sometimes beyond. The bound partner is open to a wide range of sexual stimulation, including vaginal, oral, or anal sex. Forced orgasms may be induced with manual stimulation of the genitals (in the form of a handjob or fingering). The stimulation may involve the use of vibrating sex toys, such as a vibrator, typically a wand vibrator. 

The most common way of achieving orgasm in men is by physical sexual stimulation of the penis. For women, the most common way to achieve orgasm is by direct sexual stimulation of the clitoris (meaning consistent manual, oral or other concentrated friction against the external parts of the clitoris). General statistics indicate that 70–80% of women require direct clitoral stimulation to achieve orgasm.

See also
 Erotic sexual denial
 Involuntary orgasm
 Pussy torture

References

BDSM activities
Orgasm